Megalonychus rugosicollis is a species of beetle in the family Carabidae, the only species in the genus Megalonychus.

References

Platyninae